A general election was held in the U.S. state of Kentucky on November 3, 2020. 

To vote by mail, registered Kentucky voters must request a paper ballot by October 27, 2020. Submitted ballots will begin to be processed on the morning of November 3rd.

State offices

Kentucky Senate

19 out of 38 seats in the Kentucky Senate, the odd-numbered districts, were up for election. Out of the contested seats, the Republican Party won 15 while the Democratic Party won 4. The resulting composition was 30 Republicans and 8 Democrats. Republicans gained 2 seats, Districts 7 and 29.

Kentucky House of Representatives

All 100 seats in the Kentucky House of Representatives were up for election. Republicans won 75 seats while Democrats won 25 seats. Republicans gained 14 seats.

Kentucky Supreme Court
The seat for the 7th District in the Kentucky Supreme Court was up for election.

Kentucky Court of Appeals (special)
A special election was held for the Kentucky Court of Appeals 1st District, 1st Division. The seat was vacated by Christopher S. Nickell who was elected to the Kentucky Supreme Court in 2019. The position was filled in by Chris McNeill who was appointed by Governor Andy Beshear on April 22, 2020.

Federal offices

United States President

Kentucky had 8 electoral votes in the Electoral College. Republican Donald Trump won all of them with 62% of the popular vote.

United States Senate

One out of two of Kentucky's United States Senators was up for election. Incumbent Republican Mitch McConnell won re-election with 58% of the votes.

United States House of Representatives

All 6 of Kentucky's seats in the United States House of Representatives were up for election. 5 Republicans and 1 Democrat were returned. No seats changed hands.

Ballot measures

Constitutional Amendment 1

Constitutional Amendment 2

See also
 Elections in Kentucky
 Politics of Kentucky
 Political party strength in Kentucky

References

External links
 Commonwealth of Kentucky State Board of Elections
  (State affiliate of the U.S. League of Women Voters)
 
 
 
 

 
Kentucky